The Shcherbakov Shche-2 (produced 1943–1946), also known as the TS-1 and nicknamed "Pike", was a twin-engined utility aircraft manufactured in the Soviet Union, designed by Alexei Shcherbakov for construction by OKB-47, to meet an urgent requirement for a light transport and liaison aircraft for operation by the Soviet Air Force during the Second World War. Proving to be successful, it remained in service for a number of years post-war in both civilian and military roles in the Soviet Union, and with the air forces of several allied nations. 550 built, in use until 1956 (USSR) and 1960 (foreign users).

Design and development
The German invasion of the USSR revealed that there was an urgent requirement for a light transport and utility aircraft for use by the Soviet Air Force at the front. To meet this requirement, Aleksei Shcherbakov, who had previously worked at the Kalinin design bureau, and who had also heavily influenced the design of the Polikarpov I-153 fighter before conducting work on pressure cabins and gliders, was directed to design and develop an aircraft that received the designation "TS-1".

A cabin monoplane of semi-cantilever, high-wing configuration, the TS-1 was designed to minimise the use of strategic materials, utilising mostly wood in the construction of its remarkably streamlined airframe, and being powered by two readily available Shvetsov M-11 radial engines. Parts of the Lavochkin La-5 aircraft were also used, along with undercarriage parts from the Ilyushin Il-2. The aircraft was equipped with a fixed, conventional taildragger undercarriage, and a twin-fin tail from the Petlyakov Pe-2 was also utilised.

Test-flown in late 1942 and early 1943, the aircraft, by now having been redesignated Shche-2, proved to be capable of meeting the requirement, and production began in October 1943 at OKB-47, the bureaux being established at Chkalov (Orenburg) for use by Yakovlev, but being transferred to Shcherbakov's control for the manufacture of his type.

Operational history
Alternatively, the aircraft could be used as an aircrew and navigational trainer. It was extensively used in the transport and communications roles on the Eastern Front, providing essential, if unglamorous, service.

In 1945, the improved Shche-2TM variant entered flight test, powered by uprated M-11FM engines of  each, and fitted with a modified wing. Despite the improvements in the design, the decision was made not to produce the aircraft due to a reduction in requirements for the type with the end of the war in May of that year. A proposed diesel-engined version, which began flight tests in July 1945, met the same fate.

Proving in service to be underpowered yet still easy to fly, and establishing a reputation for reliability and ease of maintenance, the Shche-2 was widely used by Soviet forces during the war. Seeing extensive service supplying guerrilla and partisan forces, the Shche-2 also proved to be useful for the delivery of paratroopers.

It is estimated that at least 550 Shche-2 aircraft were completed before the close of production in 1946, the OKB-47 factory being closed down at the conclusion of production. After the end of the war, the aircraft remained in service for several years, with the air forces of Yugoslavia and Poland making use of the type, in addition to the aircraft being extensively utilised in transport and air ambulance duties in civilian service within the Soviet Union. In addition, the Shche-2 was operated by Aeroflot on several local airline routes within the Soviet Union for several years after the end of the war, before its replacement by the Antonov An-2.

Operators

Civil operators
 
Aeroflot

Military operators
 
Polish Air Force – 5 aircraft, used 1945–1947.
 
Soviet Air Force

Yugoslav Air Force – 5 aircraft, delivered in 1945, used through 1952.

Specifications (Shche-2)

See also

References
Notes

Bibliography

Dexter, Keith. The Numbered Factories and Other Establishments of the Soviet Defence Industry, 1928 to 1967: a Guide, Part II. Research & Design Establishments: Version 1.0. University of Warwick, Department of Economics, July 2000. PDF link.
Donald, David, ed. The Complete Encyclopedia of World Aircraft. London: Orbis, 1997. .

Shche-2
1940s Soviet military transport aircraft
High-wing aircraft
Aircraft first flown in 1942
Twin piston-engined tractor aircraft